Peter Taylor Gowans (25 May 1944 – 17 November 2009) was a Scottish football winger who played more than 400 Football League games for three English clubs.

He started his career with junior team Dundee Shamrock, moving to Celtic for the 1960/61 season. However, Gowans did not play a senior first team game for the Scottish giants, and he moved to Crewe Alexandra in 1963.

Nineteen-year-old Gowans was signed by Crewe manager Jimmy McGuigan. He went on to spend 3 seasons with the Railwaymen, scoring 47 league goals for them.

Gowans moved to Aldershot in 1966/67 and made over 100 League appearances for The Shots. In 1970, he moved back north with Rochdale, and Gowans made a total of 155 senior league and cup appearances for them, scoring 22 goals. Gowans played over 400 games in the English Football League spanning a 10-year career.

After his playing career he managed Nantwich Town whilst working for British Rail as a Clerical Officer in the Main Locomotive Erecting Shop at Crewe Locomotive Works.

References 

1944 births
2009 deaths
Footballers from Dundee
Association football wingers
English Football League players
Celtic F.C. players
Crewe Alexandra F.C. players
Aldershot F.C. players
Rochdale A.F.C. players
Southport F.C. players
Nantwich Town F.C. managers
Scottish football managers
Scottish footballers